Francisco Javier Beltrán Manero (born November 5, 1972, in Madrid) is a Spanish boccia player, who has represented the country internationally at the Paralympic Games.

Personal 
Beltran is from Madrid.

Boccia 
Beltran is a BC1 classified boccia player, and is a member of the A.D. Pacema club.

Lisbon hosted the World Championships in June 2010, and he was a member of the Spain national team.  He took home a bronze in the team event. Elche, Spain hosted the Spanish Boccia Club Championship in June 2011, with Beltran participating in the event.  He finished first in the BC1 competition.

The Boccia World Championships were held in August 2011, and Beltran participated.  The event was part of the ranking process to qualify for the London Paralympic Games.  He was eliminated in the individual competition in the group round following 1 win and 2 losses. In January 2012, he participated in a boccia training camp organized by the Spain's Cerebral Palsy Federation of Sports (FEDPC) and the Spanish Sports Federation for Persons with Physical Disabilities (FEDDF) along with 24 other boccia players from around Spain held at CRE San Andrés.  The camp was part of national team preparations for the London Paralympics. He competed at the 2012 Summer Paralympics. In October 2013, he was ranked Spain's seventh best competitor in his classification.

References 

1975 births
Living people
Spanish boccia players
Paralympic boccia players of Spain
Paralympic silver medalists for Spain
Paralympic bronze medalists for Spain
Paralympic medalists in boccia
Boccia players at the 2000 Summer Paralympics
Boccia players at the 2008 Summer Paralympics
Boccia players at the 2012 Summer Paralympics
Medalists at the 2000 Summer Paralympics
Medalists at the 2008 Summer Paralympics